Holmbury may be:

 Holmbury St Mary, village in Surrey, England
 Holmbury Hill,  wooded geographical feature in Surrey, England
 SS Holmbury, ships of the Houlder Line